Imperial Commander is a 15mm science fiction war game, based on the range of metal Laserburn miniatures available from Tabletop Games. Written by Richard Halliwell and Bryan Ansell in 1981, the game still has a small but enthusiastic following. Battles take place between an oppressive, galaxy spanning "Imperium" and the religious, fanatic  "Red Redemption". Players take in turns to move, fight and command armies of between twenty and fifty miniature figures each, and following the rules, tabletop games lasting a few hours are played. This type of war game is played on a tabletop with miniature figures, vehicles and scenery. Two or more players are required. An updated version of this game, called Imperial Commander 2 was in development; however, it was never published because of copyright issues.

The rules can (as of Sep 2007) still be purchased from a company called 15mm.co.uk.

The background of Imperial Commander and the rule system of Laserburn are an influence on Games Workshop's Warhammer 40,000 tabletop game which was developed when Ansell and Halliwell were at Games Workshop and Citadel Miniatures.  In addition it has been a major influence on the development of the Beamstrike rule set.

External links
 15mm site    

Miniature wargames
Games and sports introduced in 1981